Kim Min-seo (born 9 May 1987; as Kim Mi-young) is a South Korean badminton player. Kim graduated from the Incheon National University, and affiliated with the Samsung Electro-Mechanics team in 2010. She was part of the Korean junior team that won the silver medals at the 2004 Asian Junior Championships in the girls' team event, and World Junior Championships in the mixed team event. Kim competed at the 2009 East Asian Games in Hong Kong, winning the bronze medal in the women's team event. At the 2010 Australian Open Kim captured two titles in the women's and mixed doubles event.

Achievements

BWF Grand Prix 
The BWF Grand Prix had two levels, the BWF Grand Prix and Grand Prix Gold. It was a series of badminton tournaments sanctioned by the Badminton World Federation (BWF) which was held from 2007 to 2017.

Women's doubles

Mixed doubles

  BWF Grand Prix Gold tournament
  BWF Grand Prix tournament

BWF International Challenge/Series 
Women's doubles

  BWF International Challenge tournament
  BWF International Series tournament

References

External links 
 

1987 births
Living people
South Korean female badminton players